In electronics, a pinout (sometimes written "pin-out") is a cross-reference between the contacts, or pins, of an electrical connector or electronic component, and their functions. "Pinout" now supersedes the term "basing diagram" that was the standard terminology used by the manufacturers of vacuum tubes and the RMA. The RMA started its standardization in 1934, collecting and correlating tube data for registration at what was to become the EIA. The EIA (Electronic Industries Alliance) now has many sectors reporting to it, and sets what are known as EIA standards where all registered pinouts and registered jacks can be found.

Purpose 
The functions of contacts in electrical connectors, be they power- or signaling-related, must be specified in order for connectors to be interchangeable. When connected, each contact of a connector must mate with the contact on the other connector that has the same function. If contacts of disparate functions are allowed to make contact, the connection may fail and damage may result. Therefore, pinouts are a vital reference when building and testing connectors, cables, and adapters.

If one has specified wires within a cable (for instance, the colored Ethernet cable wires in ANSI/TIA-568 T568A), then the order in which different color wires are attached to pins of an electrical connector defines the wiring scheme. In any multi-pin connector, there are multiple ways to map wires to pins, so different configurations may be created which superficially look identical but function differently. These configurations are defined by pinouts. Many connectors have multiple standard pinouts in use for different manufacturers or applications.

Terminology 
While one usage of the word pin is to refer to electrical contacts of, specifically, the male gender, its usage in pinout does not imply gender: the contact-to-function cross-reference for a connector that has only female socket contacts is still called a pinout.

Representation 
The pinout can typically be shown as a table or diagram, though it is necessary to clarify how to view the diagram, stating if it shows the backside of the connector (where wires are attached) or the "mating face" of the connector. Published pinouts, which are particularly important when different manufacturers want to interconnect their products using open standards, are typically provided by the connector or equipment manufacturer. Some pinouts are provided by 3rd parties since some connectors are not well documented by the manufacturer.

While repairing electronic devices, an electronics technician uses electronic test equipment to "pin out" each component on a PCB. The technician probes each pin of the component in turn, comparing the expected signal on each pin to the actual signal on that pin.

Example pinouts

USB pinout 
Viewed from the front (outside) of Female Type A USB receptacle:

 +5V (Red)
 −Data (White)
 +Data (Green)
 GND (Black)

PS/2 pinout

4017 decade counter

LM741 operational amplifier

See also 
 Datasheet
 Piping and instrumentation diagram
 Circuit diagram
 Schematic
 4000 series
 Crossover cable

References

External links

 The Hardware Book - Pinout collection
 Crossover search of pinouts at pinout.net
 Pinouts of hardware connectors with description of common interfaces at pinouts.ru
 Pinouts (pin-out) - Historical Pinouts collection
 74xxx and 40xx (pin-outs) -  Pinouts collection
 Pin Configuration of ICs and semiconductors (pin-outs) -  Pinouts collection

Electrical connectors

fr:Boîtier de circuit intégré#Brochage